The 2019 Sun Belt Conference men's basketball tournament was the postseason men's basketball tournament for Sun Belt Conference during the 2018–19 NCAA Division I men's basketball season. Tournament first-round games were played at the campus of the higher seeded team on March 12. The remainder of the tournament was held from March 14–17, 2019, in New Orleans, Louisiana, at Lakefront Arena. Georgia State defeated UT Arlington 73–64 in the championship game to win the tournament, and received the conference's automatic bid to the 2019 NCAA tournament. It was the third tournament championship for Georgia State, and their second consecutive.

Seeds
Only the top 10 of the 12 conference teams were eligible for the tournament. The 3rd and 4th place teams received a double bye to the quarterfinals of the tournament, while the top 2 teams received a triple bye to the semifinals. Teams were seeded by record within the conference, with a tiebreaker system to seed teams with identical conference records.

Schedule

Bracket

References

Sun Belt Conference men's basketball tournament
Tournament
Sun Belt Conference men's basketball tournament
Sun Belt Conference men's basketball tournament
Basketball competitions in New Orleans
College basketball tournaments in Louisiana
2010s in New Orleans